Nikolay Tess (1921 – December 7, 2006 in Riga, Latvia) was one of the few functionaries in charge of political repressions in the former Soviet Union who were convicted for this activity. 

Nikolajs Tess, a former operative of Ministry for State Security, a citizen of Russia, was the 10th Soviet official (and second Russian citizen) charged in Latvia under the Criminal Law Article 68.1, crimes against humanity, in relation to mass deportations from Latvia in 1941-1949. Tess was charged for his role in deportations of March 25, 1949.
According to the indictment made in March 2001, "Tess compiled and signed an order to deport 42 families, 138 people, to forced settlement in remote parts of the Soviet Union. There were 14 children among the deported." 

He was found guilty on December 16, 2003 and sentenced to 2 years of suspended imprisonment after a lengthy process delayed by ill health. Afterwards, he appealed to Latvian Supreme Court (unsuccessfully) and European Court of Human Rights (the latter found complaint partly inadmissible in 2008).
Tess did not consider himself guilty, claiming that he was acting in the capacity for only 2½ months and he was mainly in charge of verifying the match of the lists prepared by local administration against the Ministry lists.

Russia has criticized Latvia for trials of former Soviet officials and Soviet partisans accusing of violation of international standards (e.g., Russian Foreign Ministry note of November 18, 2004).

Tess died in a Riga hospital on December 7, 2006, at the age of 86.

In 2014, the European Court of Human Rights declared the application of Nikolay Tess inadmissible. Concerning the merits, the complaint was rejected due to non-exhaustion of domestic remedies — Mr Tess had not contested the law the conviction was based on before the Constitutional Court.

See also
Arnold Meri, a Soviet official charged by Estonia with genocide who died before the 2009 trial could be concluded
Vasiliy Kononov, a former Soviet partisan accused of ordering the killing of civilians in a village in 1944

References

External links
A November 2003 article about the case 
A December 2003 article about the conviction 
ECtHR decision

1921 births
2006 deaths
Article 6 of the European Convention on Human Rights
Article 7 of the European Convention on Human Rights
European Court of Human Rights cases involving Latvia
Political repression in the Soviet Union
Politics of Latvia
Russian people convicted of crimes against humanity
Soviet people